Anisoscelis luridus is a species of leaf-footed bug in the family Coreidae. It was first described by Harry Brailovsky in 2016 and it has been recorded in Texas, Mexico, Central and South America.

References 

Insects described in 2016
luridus